Fernando Calero Villa (born 14 September 1995) is a Spanish professional footballer who plays for RCD Espanyol as a central defender.

Club career

Malaga 
Calero was born in boecillo, Valladolid, Castile and León, and finished his formation with Málaga CF. He made his senior debut with the reserves on 9 March 2014, starting in a 2–1 Tercera División home win against Loja CD.

Calero scored his first senior goal on 31 January 2015, netting the first in a 2–2 away draw against UD Maracena.

Valladolid 
On 23 June of the following year he joined Real Valladolid, club he already represented as a youth, being initially assigned to the B-team in Segunda División B. In his only season with the side, he was an undisputed starter, scoring once in 37 appearances.

On 8 August 2017, Calero was definitely promoted to the main squad in Segunda División by manager Luis César Sampedro, being handed the number 5 jersey. He made his professional debut on 6 September, coming on as a substitute for fellow youth graduate Ángel in a 2–0 away win against SD Huesca, for the season's Copa del Rey.

On 15 November 2017, Calero renewed his contract until 2021. He scored his first professional goal the following 27 May, in a 2–3 away loss against Real Zaragoza, and featured regularly during the campaign as his side achieved promotion to La Liga.

Calero made his debut in the main category of Spanish football on 17 August 2018, starting in a 0–0 away draw against Girona FC.

Espanyol 
On 9 August 2019, Calero agreed to a five-year contract with Espanyol for a reported fee of €8 million. His release clause was set at €40 million.

Career statistics

Club

References

External links

Profile at the RCD Espanyol website

1995 births
Living people
Sportspeople from the Province of Valladolid
Spanish footballers
Footballers from Castile and León
Association football defenders
La Liga players
Segunda División players
Segunda División B players
Tercera División players
Atlético Malagueño players
Real Valladolid Promesas players
Real Valladolid players
RCD Espanyol footballers